The slender tube-nosed bat (Murina gracilis) is a species of vesper bat in the family Vespertilionidae found only in Taiwan.

References

Murininae
Endemic fauna of Taiwan
Mammals described in 2009